The University of Washington Huskies women's soccer team represent the University of Washington in the Pac-12 Conference of NCAA Division I soccer. Home games are played at Husky Soccer Stadium, located on University of Washington's campus in Seattle.

Players and staff

Current roster

All-time record 

Source: http://grfx.cstv.com/photos/schools/wash/sports/w-soccer/auto_pdf/2011-12/misc_non_event/wsocrecordbook.pdf

Individual honors 
National Soccer Coaches Association (NSCAA) Coach of the Year (West Region):
 Lesle Gallimore – 2000

NSCAA Assistant Coach of the Year:
 Amy Griffin – 2004

Hermann Award Nominee:
 Kate Deines – 2011
 Hope Solo – 2001–2002

NSCAA All-American (2nd):
 Tina Frimpong – 2004
 Hope Solo – 2000–2001
 Melanie Brennan – 1993

NSCAA All-Region:
 Kate Deines – 2010 (1st), 2009 (3rd)
 Jorde LaFontaine-Kussman – 2010 (3rd)
 Kendyl Pele – 2010 (3rd)
 Veronica Perez – 2009 (2nd), 2008 (2nd)
 Tina Frimpong – 2003 (1st)
 Nikki Gamble – 2003 (3rd)
 Melissa Gamble – 2003 (3rd)
 Hope Solo – 2001 (1st), 2000 (1st), 1999 (2nd)
 Caroline Putz – 2001 (3rd), 2000 (3rd)
 Andrea Morelli – 2000 (2nd)
 Theresa Wagner – 2000 (2nd)
 Tina Thompson – 1996 (1st)
 Katey Ward – 1996 (2nd)
 Tara Bilanski – 1995 (1st), 1994 (1st)
 Sanya Trandum – 1995 (2nd)
 Samanta Obara – 1994 (1st)
 Melanie Brennan – 1994 (1st)

Pac-12 Player of the Year:  
 Tina Frimpong – 2003–2004
 Hope Solo – 2001

Pac-12 Defender of the Year:
 Andrea Morelli – 1999

Pac-12 Medal Winner:
 Tina Frimpong – 2004
 Jeannine Jensen – 1994

References

External links 

 
1991 establishments in Washington (state)
Association football clubs established in 1991